Donal Cam O'Sullivan Beare, Prince of Beare, 1st Count of Berehaven (1561–1618), was an Irish nobleman and soldier who was the last independent Chief of the Name of the O'Sullivan clan. He was thus the last O'Sullivan Beare, a Gaelic princely title, on the Beara Peninsula in the southwest of Ireland during the early seventeenth century, when the English Crown was attempting to secure their rule over the whole island.

Early life

Donal's father was killed in 1563, but he was considered too young to inherit and the clan's leadership passed to the chief's surviving brother Eoin, who was confirmed by Dublin Castle administration with the title Lord of Beare and Bantry. In order to consolidate his position, Eoin accepted the authority of Queen Elizabeth I and was knighted, thus becoming Sir Eoin. In 1587, Donal asserted his own claim to leadership of the clan, petitioning the Dublin Castle administration to put aside Sir Eoin's appointment with a claim derived from English laws based on absolute male primogeniture. These laws did not recognise age as relevant to inheritance rights. Keen to extend English legal authority over Ireland, the Dublin Castle administration accepted Donal's claim. He subsequently became The O'Sullivan Beare, head of the clan.

Nine Years War

By 1600, the province of Munster had been devastated by battle, and Irish Catholics had lost over half a million acres (4,000 km²) of land to Protestant settlers following the defeat of the Desmond Rebellions.

In the lead up to the Nine Years' War O'Sullivan kept his distance from the rebel cause, but in time he joined a confederation of Gaelic chiefs led by Hugh O'Neill, 3rd Earl of Tyrone, An Ó Néill, and Red Hugh O'Donnell, An Ó Domhnaill, of Ulster. Conflict had broken out in 1594, and Tyrone secured support from Philip II of Spain. The Spanish sent a force under the command of Don Juan D'Aquilla in 1601. O'Sullivan wrote to the Spanish king in submission to his authority, but the letter was intercepted by the English. In early 1602 the allied Irish and Spanish forces met an English force at the Battle of Kinsale and were defeated.

O'Sullivan resolved to continue the struggle by taking control of the castle of Dunboy. In June 1602 English forces attacked Dunboy and the castle fell after a brief siege. The entire company of defenders was killed in combat or hung afterwards.

O'Sullivan's march

Donal himself was absent from the siege of Dunboy, having travelled to Ulster for a conference with Tyrone. His letter to Philip II left him with little hope of a pardon from the English, and he continued the fight with guerilla tactics. He also maintained a stronghold on Dursey Island which was attacked by an English detachment under the command of George Carew. According to Philip O'Sullivan Beare, Carew's men killed all 300 occupants of the stronghold, including women and children who had taken shelter there, in what became known as the Dursey Island massacre. After the fall of Dursey and Dunboy, O'Sullivan Beare, Lord of Beara and Bantry, gathered his remaining followers and set off northwards on a 500-kilometre march with 1,000 of his remaining people, starting on 31 December 1602. He hoped to meet Lord Tyrone on the shores of Lough Neagh.

He fought a long rearguard action northwards through Ireland, through Munster, Connacht and Ulster, during which the much larger English force and their Irish allies fought him all the way. The march was marked by the suffering of the fleeing and starving O'Sullivans as they sought food from an already decimated Irish countryside in winter. They faced equally desperate people in this, often resulting in hostility, such as from the Mac Egans at Redwood Castle in Tipperary and at Donohill in O'Dwyer's country, where they raided the food store of The 10th Earl of Ormond.  O'Sullivan marched through Aughrim, where he raided villages for food and met local resistance. 

He was barred entrance to Glinsk Castle and led his refugees further north. On their arrival at Brian Oge O'Rourke's castle in West Breifne on 14 January 1603, after a fortnight's hard marching and fighting, only 35 of the original 1,000 remained. Many had died in battles or from exposure and hunger, and others had taken shelter or fled along the route. O'Sullivan Beare had marched over 500 kilometres, crossed the River Shannon in the dark of a midwinter night (having taken just two days to make a boat of skin and hazel rods to carry 28 at a time the half-kilometre across the river), fought battles and constant skirmishes, and lost almost all of his people during the hardships of the journey.

In County Leitrim, O'Sullivan Beare sought to join with other northern chiefs to launch a campaign against the English Crown, and organised a force to this end, but resistance ended when Tyrone signed the Treaty of Mellifont. O'Sullivan, like other members of the Gaelic nobility of Ireland who fled, sought exile, making his escape to Spain by ship. The Beara-Breifne Way long-distance walking trail follows closely the line of the historical march.

Exile

When he left Ireland, Cornelius O'Driscoll and other Irish knights helped him and his clan. In Spain, O'Sullivan Beare was welcomed by Philip III. His princely status was reconfirmed, and he received a commission as an imperial general. His nephew, Philip O'Sullivan Beare, was important in this regard and his 1618 disquisition in Latin, A Briefe Relation of Ireland and the diversity of Irish in the same, was influential.

In 1618, The O'Sullivan Beare, Prince of Beare and 1st Count of Berehaven, was murdered just as he was leaving Mass in the Plaza de Santo Domingo in Madrid. The man who killed him was John Bathe, a Anglo-Irishman from Dublin who had been disfigured in a duel by the prince's nephew, on account of some arguments between Bathe and O'Sullivan; it was also claimed that the man was a spy on behalf the English Crown.

The O'Sullivan Beare had a reputation as "one of the most celebrated Irish soldiers", which helped to open doors for later soldiers from his line. About 165 years later, John Sullivan, regarded as a descendant of O'Sullivan Beare, served as a general in the American Revolution.

See also
O'Sullivan
Eóganachta
Irish nobility

In popular culture

The Last Prince of Ireland by Morgan Llywelyn
March into Oblivion by Michael J. Carroll
O'Sullivan's Odyssey by Rick Spier

References

1561 births
1613 deaths
Flight of the Earls
Irish lords
Irish expatriates in Spain
People of Elizabethan Ireland
Wild Geese (soldiers)
People from County Cork
16th-century Irish monarchs
17th-century Irish monarchs
Irish soldiers in the Spanish Army
Irish emigrants to Spain
Deaths by stabbing in Spain
People of the Nine Years' War (Ireland)
Irish chiefs of the name